Clay Cross (born 26 November 1977 in Sydney) is an Australian shot putter. He won the Australian championships in 1996, 1997, 1999 and 2005.

His personal best is 19.42 metres, achieved in June 2004. This result makes him the all-time number one for New South Wales.

His brother Ryan Cross is a notable rugby league/rugby union player, and his father Paul played rugby league in the 1966 Grand Final.

Achievements

External links
 2006 Commonwealth Games bio

1977 births
Living people
Australian male shot putters
Athletes from Sydney
Athletes (track and field) at the 1998 Commonwealth Games
Athletes (track and field) at the 2002 Commonwealth Games
Athletes (track and field) at the 2006 Commonwealth Games
Commonwealth Games competitors for Australia
20th-century Australian people
21st-century Australian people